XHRRA-FM is a noncommercial radio station on 106.1 FM in Fresnillo, Zacatecas. The station is owned by Grupo Radiofónico ZER and is known as Stereo Fresnillo.

History
XHRRA was permitted on August 1, 2012.

References

Radio stations in Zacatecas
Radio stations established in 2012